Patrick J. "Pat" Kelly (born September 8, 1935) is an American retired ice hockey coach who co-founded and served as the first commissioner of the East Coast Hockey League. He is the namesake of the Kelly Cup. Kelley also coached the Colorado Rockies for two years and the Birmingham Bulls in the late-1970s.

Early life 
Kelly was born in Sioux Lookout, Ontario. He played junior hockey with the St. Catharines Teepees of the Ontario Junior Hockey League in 1952.

Career 
He played professionally for the Springfield Indians of the American Hockey League, the Trois-Rivières Lions in the Quebec Hockey League, Troy Bruins of the International Hockey League and the Greensboro Generals of the Eastern Hockey League. He helped Crowland capture the 1948–1949 Bantam B Championship of Ontario, beating Peterborough in the finals.

Coaching and management 
Kelly began his coaching career in the Eastern Hockey League with the Jersey Devils and later the Clinton Comets. Clinton was 151–39–28 and won three straight regular season and postseason titles from 1967 to 1970. In the 1967–1968 season, the Comets finished with a 57–5–10 record, making them the only professional team in history to lose only five games or less in a season. In the 1969–1970 season, Kelly was named Minor League Coach of the Year by The Hockey News. Kelly served as head coach and general manager for Charlotte in the Southern Hockey League from 1973–76 guiding the Checkers to a 136–68–12 record, two regular season titles and two postseason titles while earning Coach of the Year honors in the SHL twice.

He coached the Colorado Rockies in the National Hockey League in 1977–78 and is the only coach in history to lead the Rockies into the Stanley Cup Playoffs. Following coaching stops in the AHL, Kelly went to Peoria in the IHL where he led the Rivermen to the Turner Cup in his first season behind the bench in 1984–85. He recorded his 800th career win on January 4, 1987 and was inducted into the Peoria Sports Hall of Fame in February 1990. Kelly was inducted into the Roanoke Hall of Fame and the Sports Hall of Fame in his hometown of Welland, Ontario in 1998, and in March 2002 he became the first inductee into the Greensboro Hockey Hall of Fame when the Generals retired his uniform number (5).

Kelly was named commissioner emeritus of the ECHL following the 1995–1996 season, after serving as commissioner for the first eight seasons of the ECHL.  He celebrated his 50th season in hockey in 2002–2003.

In 2008, he was inducted into the ECHL Hall of Fame.

Coaching record

References

External links
 

1935 births
Clinton Comets players
Colorado Rockies (NHL) coaches
ECHL
Lester Patrick Trophy recipients
Living people
People from Sioux Lookout
Southern Hockey League (1973–1977) coaches